Invisible Strangler is a 1984 American horror film directed by John Florea, an alternate cut of the 1978 film  The Astral Factor, also known as The Astral Fiend, starring Robert Foxworth, Stefanie Powers, Cesare Danova, Sue Lyon and Elke Sommer. Arthur C. Pierce wrote the screenplay and co-directed the film uncredited.

The film was originally released in 1978 as The Astral Factor aka The Astral Fiend. It was later re-edited into a new, shorter version entitled The Invisible Strangler and released on video in 1984. Invisible Strangler runs 85 minutes, about ten minutes shorter than The Astral Fiend, and most of the killer's dialogue lines during the murders were edited out, while new music and some entirely new scenes were added.

The film is available today on DVD as The Astral Fiend, which is the original uncut 1978 version of the film. It is on a double feature dvd with The Brain Machine (1972).

Plot summary 

Studying the paranormal allows a convicted strangler to make himself invisible to kill five women who testified against him at his trial. The movie is about trying to catch the invisible murderer.

Cast 

 Robert Foxworth as Lt. Charles Barrett
 Stefanie Powers as Candy Barrett
 Sue Lyon as Darlene DeLong
 Mark Slade as Detective Holt
 Leslie Parrish as Colleen Hudson
 Marianna Hill as Bambi Greer
 Elke Sommer as Chris Hartman
 Percy Rodrigues as Captain Wells
 Alex Dreier as Dr. Ulmer
 Rayford Barnes as Sgt. Archer
 Frederick Tully as Detective Sloan
 Frank Ashmore as Roger Sands
 Larry Golden as Detective Rouseau
 Renata Vaselle as Roxane Raymond
 Cesare Danova as Mario
 Eddie Firestone as Jacobs
 Bill Overton as Kingsley
 Carol Blalock as Sgt. Davis
 Jennifer Burton as Policewoman
 George Cheung as Jim, Medical Examiner
 Albert Cole as Cop in Alley
 John Hart as Harbormaster
 Robert F. Hoy as Harris
 Harry Lewis as Stage Manager
 Walter O. Miles as Fingerprint Man
 Queenie Smith as Darlene's Landlady
 Al Tipay as Miller
 Frank DeSal as Prison guard
 Troy Melton as Prison guard
 George Robotham as Cemetery Guard
 Jerry Wills as Cop
 Budd Bryan as Lead Dancer
 Bea Marie Busch as Dancer
 Bonnie Evans as Dancer
 Kathy Gale as Dancer
 Marcia Hewitt as Dancer
 Nancy Martin as Dancer
 Judy Van Wormer as Dancer

References

External links 

 
 
 

1978 films
American mystery films
1970s science fiction films
Films about invisibility
1970s English-language films
Films directed by John Florea
1970s American films